Trapania armilla is a species of sea slug, a dorid nudibranch, a marine gastropod mollusc in the family Goniodorididae.

Distribution
This species was first described from Bali, Indonesia.

Description
This goniodorid nudibranch is opaque white in colour, with a thin brown ring halfway along the oral tentacles. The gills are unusually large for a Trapania and the body is covered with raised irregular bumps.

Ecology
Trapania armilla probably feeds on Entoprocta, which often grow on sponges and other living substrata.

References

Goniodorididae
Gastropods described in 2008